William Philip Kalfass (March 3, 1916 – September 8, 1968) was a Major League Baseball pitcher who played in  with the Philadelphia Athletics. He batted right and threw left-handed.

External links

1916 births
1968 deaths
Major League Baseball pitchers
Baseball players from New York (state)
Columbia Lions baseball players
Philadelphia Athletics players
Nyack Rocklands players
Columbia Senators players
Greenville Spinners players
Oswego Netherlands players
Trenton Senators players
Washington Generals (baseball) players
Wheeling Stogies players